A browser exploit is  a form of malicious code that takes advantage of a flaw or vulnerability in an operating system or piece of software with the intent to breach browser security to alter a user's browser settings without their knowledge. Malicious code may exploit ActiveX, HTML, images, Java, JavaScript, and other Web technologies and cause the browser to run arbitrary code.

Symptoms

Users whose web browsers have fallen victim of a successful browser exploit may find their homepage, search page, and/or favorites have been changed. Other signs include Internet settings options within the browser being altered, access being blocked to specific functions, and the redirection of incorrectly typed URL prefixes.

Prevention

There are multiple ways users can protect their web browsers from falling victim to a browser exploit. Such things include installing firewall software, keeping software updated, being cautious when downloading files, and not opening email attachments from unknown sources.

Notable browser exploits

JailbreakMe is a series of browser based exploits used to jailbreak Apple's iOS mobile operating system. It uses an exploit in the browser's PDF parser to execute unauthorised code and gain access to the underlying operating system.

See also
Browser security
Internet security

References

External links
Online Threats - Browser exploits | WOT Web of Trust

Web security exploits
Web browsers